In dentistry, diagnostic wax-up is used to visualize the results of a prosthetic case prior to the treatment being executed.

References

Prosthodontology